Farob is a village and jamoat in western Tajikistan. It is part of the city of Panjakent in Sughd Region. The jamoat has a total population of 8,650 (2015).

References

Populated places in Sughd Region
Jamoats of Tajikistan